Jerome Courtland (December 27, 1926 – March 1, 2012) was an American actor, director and producer. He acted in films in the 1940s, 1950s and 1960s, and in television in the 1950s and 1960s. Courtland also appeared on Broadway in the musical Flahooley in the early 1950s. He directed and produced television series in the 1960s, 1970s and 1980s. He served in the Pacific Theater of World War II.

Biography

Actor
Jerome "Jerry" Courtland was born Courtland Jourolmon Jr. on December 27, 1926, in Knoxville, Tennessee. At 17, he attended a Hollywood party with his mother, a professional singer. A chance meeting with director Charles Vidor led to a screen test at Columbia Pictures and a seven-year contract. Courtland's feature debut was in Vidor's 1944 screwball comedy Together Again, before he joined the U.S. Army, serving in the Pacific Theatre of World War II.

After the War, Courtland starred opposite Shirley Temple in Kiss and Tell, followed by appearances in more than a dozen films including The Man From Colorado (1948), Battleground (1949), The Palomino (1950), The Barefoot Mailman (1951), and Take the High Ground (1953).

He was a licensed pilot and trained in stunt flying.

In 1951 Courtland starred on Broadway as the romantic lead in the very short-lived musical Flahooley with Barbara Cook. Returning to California, he was frequently seen in guest roles on Westerns including The Rifleman, Death Valley Days and The Virginian.

In 1957, he starred in six episodes of ABC's Disneyland in the miniseries The Saga of Andy Burnett, the story of a Pittsburgh, Pennsylvania, man who comes west to the Rocky Mountains. This was an attempt by Walt Disney to follow up on the success of the first television miniseries, Davy Crockett. In 1958, Courtland guest starred in an episode of the television Western series The Rifleman. His voice was heard singing the title song during the credits in the movie Old Yeller. In 1959 he played the role of Army Lt. Henry Nowlan in the Disney film Tonka. Also that year he narrated the Disney short Noah's Ark, nominated for an Oscar the following year for Best Short Subject (Cartoon).

Courtland starred in the 1959-1960 television series Tales of the Vikings, as the lead character, Leif. He dyed his hair and beard blonde for the role. The series was produced by Kirk Douglas' film production company Brynaprod, was filmed in Germany, and ran for 39 episodes.

Courtland was cast as newspaperman William Byers in the 1965 episode, "The Race at Cherry Creek", on the syndicated television anthology series, Death Valley Days, hosted by Ronald Reagan. In the story line, Byers races against time to put out the first newspaper in the Colorado Territory during the gold rush year of 1859. His Rocky Mountain News became the first publication in the territory. Though strongly encouraged in the pursuit by his wife Elizabeth ([Nancy Rennick), Byers' pressman, Andy Kate (Alvy Moore), is pessimistic about their chances of publishing first.

Producer
In the 60s, Courtland gave up acting to produce for Disney, Screen Gems, and others.

In 1975, he produced the Walt Disney film, Ride a Wild Pony.

He was one of two producers of the partly animated 1977 Disney movie Pete's Dragon.

He was the producer of Escape to Witch Mountain in 1975, and The Devil and Max Devlin.

Director
In 1968 Courtland made his directorial debut with several episodes of The Flying Nun. In the 1980s he directed episodes of Aaron Spelling's Dynasty, Fantasy Island, The Love Boat and The Colbys.

In the early 1990s he made guest appearances on L.A. Law and Knots Landing. In 1997 he moved to the Chicago area, where for five years he taught acting and directing for the camera at Columbia College.

Courtland died on March 1, 2012, of heart disease in the Santa Clarita, California.

Partial filmography

Together Again (1944) - Gilbert Parker
Kiss and Tell (1945) - Dexter Franklin
The Man from Colorado (1948) - Johnny Howard
Make Believe Ballroom (1949) - Gene Thomas
Tokyo Joe (1949) - Danny
Battleground (1949) - Abner Spudler
A Woman of Distinction (1950) - Jerome
The Palomino (1950) - Steve Norris
When You're Smiling (1950) - Gerald Durham
Santa Fe (1951) - Terry Canfield
The Texas Rangers (1951) - Danny Carver - alias Bonner
Sunny Side of the Street (1951) - Ted Mason
The Barefoot Mailman (1951) - Steven Pierton
Cripple Creek (1952) - Larry Galland
Take the High Ground! (1953) - Elvin C. Carey
The Bamboo Prison (1954) - Arkansas
The Rifleman (1958, TV Series) - Johnny Gibbs
Tonka (1958) - Lt. Henry Nowlan
 (1960) - Teddy Hill
Queen of the Seas (1961) - Peter Goodwin
Café Oriental (1962) - Michael
Tharus Son of Attila (1962) - Tharus
Black Spurs (1965) - Sam Grubbs
The Restless Ones (1965)
Escape to Witch Mountain (1975, Produced)
Ride a Wild Pony (1975, Produced)
The Wonderful World of Disney - episode "The Young Runaways" (1978, TV Series, Produced)
Disney's Wonderful World - episode "Sultan and the Rock Star" (1980, TV Series, Produced)
Disney's Wonderful World - episode "The Ghosts of Buxley Hall: Parts 1 & 2" (1980, TV Series, Produced)

References

External links
 
 
 
 Staff (March 5, 2012).  "Jerome Courtland dies at 85 Directed Episodes of Aaron Spelling Dramas". Variety.  Retrieved August 24, 2013.
 Jerry Courtland Movie Memorial
 Theme song from "'Old Yeller"

1926 births
2012 deaths
20th-century American male actors
20th-century American singers
21st-century American male actors
21st-century American singers
Male actors from California
Male actors from Tennessee
American male film actors
American male musical theatre actors
American male stage actors
American male television actors
American television directors
American military personnel of World War II
Film directors from California
Film directors from Tennessee
Film producers from California
Singers from Tennessee
People from Knoxville, Tennessee
Singers from California
Television producers from California
20th-century American male singers
21st-century American male singers
Television producers from Tennessee